Kshetrajna  (Devnagari: क्षेत्रज्ञ) means the one who knows the field of the body, soul, physical matter. It is the conscious principle in the corporeal frame. In the thirteenth chapter of the Bhagavad Gita, Krishna explains the distinction between the Kshetra and the Kshetrajna.

Overview

The Kshetra or the field refers to the body which is material, mutable, transitory and perishable, the Kshetrajna refers to the conscious knower of the body who is of the same essence as Knowledge, immutable, eternal and imperishable, the knower of the body is the soul residing in the body. Kshetra is Prakrti or matter which is insentient, and the knower of the Kshetra is the Purusha who is sentient. True knowledge is knowing and understanding both these two factors, the insentient and sentient. The knowledge of Prakrti only, is called the Apara Vidya or Lower knowledge, and that pertaining to the Purusha is called the Para Vidya or Higher knowledge. in the Bhagavad Gita, Arjuna is told that the distinctive nature of God is eight-fold constituted by the five primordial elements, mind, intellect and the ego-sense, but that is the lower nature which is inferior, impure, troublesome, whose essence is bondage; the higher nature, which is the pure essential nature of God, is the higher living being, the Kshetrajna, the field-knower, the cause leading to the assumption of vital force by which the world is penetrated and upheld.

Kshetra (the Field)

In the opening Sloka of Chapter XIII of the Bhagavad Gita, Krishna defines Kshetra and establishes the identity of the individual soul, the conscious knower of the Kshetra, with the Universal Soul.

इदं शरीरं कौन्तेय क्षेत्रमित्यभिधीयते |
एतद्यो वेत्ति तं प्राहुः क्षेत्रज्ञ इति तद्विदः || (XIII.1)

"This body, Arjuna, is termed as the Field (Kshetra); and him who knows it, the sages discerning the truth about both refer to as the knower of the Field (Kshetrajna"

Thereafter, He explains that - the five elements, the ego, the intellect, the Unmanifest (Primordial Matter), the ten organs (of perception and action), the mind, and the five objects of sense (sound, touch, colour, taste and smell); also desire, aversion, pleasure, pain, the physical body, consciousness, firmness, this is the Kshetra with its evolutes (XIII.5-6).

Jnana (Knowledge)

Arjuna is told that – absence of pride, freedom from hypocrisy, non-violence, forbearance, straightness of the body, speech and mind, devout service of the preceptor, internal and external purity, steadfastness of mind and control of body, mind and the senses, dispassion towards the objects of enjoyment of this world and the next, and also absence of egotism, pondering again and again on the pain and evils inherent in birth, death, old age and disease; absence of attachment and the feeling of mineness in respect of son, wife, home etc., and constant equipoise of mind both in favourable and unfavourable circumstances; unflinching devotion to God through exclusive attachment, living in secluded and holy places, and finding no enjoyment in the company of men; fixity in self-knowledge and seeing God as the object of true knowledge – all this is declared as knowledge; and what is other than this is called ignorance (XIII 7-11).

Sankara in his Bhasya explains that devotion inspired by conviction that wavers not, is unwavering devotion, which devotion is knowledge. Spiritual knowledge is that of the Self, meditation on it is the perception of the content of philosophical knowledge. Knowledge is what ought to be known and the knowable is that by which one attains immortality.429-430

Knower of Kshetras

Krishna tells Arjuna that:-
 
क्षेत्रज्ञ चापि मां विद्धि सर्वक्षेत्रेषु भारत |
क्षेत्रक्षेत्रज्ञयोर्ज्ञानं यत्तज्ज्ञानं मतं मम || (13.3)

"Know Myself to be the Kshetrajna (knower of field) in all the Kshetras, O descendant of Bharata. It is the knowledge of Kshetra and Kshetrajna which I consider as the ultimate knowledge."

Having identified Himself as the Kshetrajna of all kshetras, Krishna proceeds to describe in detail Him who is sat (being) and asat (non-being) both, the Sole Witness who is eternal and present everywhere and in all things, and failing to reach Whom, speech together with the mind returneth (Taittiriya Upanishad II.9) – this indescribable entity is Brahman, ज्ञेयम् - the object worth knowing, विज्ञाय मद्भावाय उपपद्यते – in whose being the devout knowing which reality enter (merge) (VIII.18). Krishna directs that one should know Prakrti and Purusha to be beginningless – that the former is responsible for bringing forth the evolutes and the instruments, and the latter, who is the individual soul seated in Prakrti, is declared to be the cause of experience of joys and sorrows, and attachment to Gunas is the cause of birth in sat-asat-yoni. And that - देहेऽस्मिन् पुरुषः परः – Purusha, the individual soul dwelling in the body, is the same as the Supreme Soul Brahman.  Thus, Kshetrajna is the pure conscious spirit that is purusha and atman. Krishna does not describe Kshetrajna, He describes that which is required to be known. When ज्ञेयम् - Jneya is realized, there disappears all duality and separateness in the form of knower, knowledge and what is to be known Every Kshetra does not have a separate Kshetrajna, the Lord is the supreme Kshetrajna in all the Kshetras.

Vedic concept

The concept of “Sameness” or “Oneness” of the individual soul and the Universal Soul emphasized by the Upanishads, the Brahma Sutras, the Bhagavad Gita and other allied texts is but an echo of what was long ago revealed to the Vedic Rishis and has lingered on. Ātman (Hinduism) Dirghatamas one of the Angirasa Rishis of the Rig Veda in Mantra 4 of Sukta I.163 addressed to Agni states:-

त्रीणि त आहुर्दिवि बन्धनानि त्रीण्यप्सु त्रीण्यन्तः समुद्रे |
उतेव मे वरुणश्छन्त्स्यर्वन्यत्रा त आहुः परमं जनित्रम् ||

"O enlightened One ! The place of your origin or birth is the same as that of mine; O the finest One ! if you are endowed with strength I too possess the same kind of strength (of the same magnitude); O the bright One (Agni) ! if you so happen to exist in three states or forms so does water (the finest divine aspects) and the earth (the gross supporting aspect) and all objects (the entire transformation of the First Cause) dispersed in space (existing outside and within all) have three forms, O learned One ! if your birth and knowledge is divine so is mine."

This unique awareness of Sameness which is actually the awareness of Oneness is the knowledge of Reality, the true knowledge of existence, gaining which knowledge the true seeker of knowledge ceases to see difference in this wide world which difference is seen only as so many names echoing and re-echoing persistently in one’s mind.

Sankara’s opinion

Sankara, in his commentary on Chapter XIII of the Bhagavad Gita with regard to the distinction between Ishvara and Jiva since the identification of the prajna (the self in deep sleep-state) with Ishvara is problematic, states:-
“Now as to the objections that Ishvara would be a samsarin if He be one with Kshetrajna, and that if Kshetrajnas be one with Ishvara there can be no samsara because there is no samsarin: these objections have been met by saying that knowledge and ignorance are distinct in kind and effects, - that all that is knowable is the Kshetra, and Kshetrajna is the knower and none else.” 
And, therefore, avarna dosha (obscuration of intellect) which is the basic feature of deep sleep affects only individual beings and not God.

References

Upanishadic concepts
Vedas
Hindu philosophical concepts
Sanskrit words and phrases